The Trench is the name applied to both a fictional kingdom, and its inhabitants as a group, that escaped the destruction of Atlantis in DC comics.

The Trench appear in the 2018 live-action DC Extended Universe film Aquaman.

Publication history
The Trench first appeared in Aquaman (vol. 7) #1 (November 2011) and were created by Geoff Johns. In September 2011, The New 52 had rebooted DC's continuity. Johns introduced the Trench into this new timeline, making them antagonists in the Aquaman series.

Fictional biography
The Trench are a race of vicious, cannibalistic, ocean-dwelling creatures that were relegated to living in the depths of the Ocean and evolved accordingly.
Along with the Xebelians and Atlantians, the Trench are one of the surviving kingdoms of the original Atlantis. The Trench adapted to living in a trench near the Mid-Atlantic Ridge and developed an alternate language. They eventually rose from their domain, beneath the ocean floor in search of food and devoured anything that's in their way. With their first attack, they demonstrate a complete lack of empathy, relying on only the primal instinct to feed, even eating their own slain brethren. All the creatures seem to be similar with the exception of their Queen which is the den mother and supreme ruler of the Trench, and her alpha king, who differ physically in form from the worker class of Trench. When the alpha marks its food, the others back off. After massacring a boat and local fishing community, the police call in Aquaman and Mera to help investigate. The police divers eventually find what looks to be a cocoon in the water, which contains many creatures of the Trench. While fighting off the creatures' attacks, the alpha marks Aquaman as food to be brought back to the ocean floor, where they originated.

Aquaman fiercely battles the alpha as Mera holds off the rest. The alpha calls for a retreat with their captured food as they dive back into the deep. Aquaman takes one of their fallen to be further examined. Mera and Arthur dive into the Trench to save the townspeople. They discover a crashed Atlantean ship that had been attacked by the creatures. They also find the spawn of the Trench creatures to be sick and dying. Arthur and Mera then discover the throne room/breeding chamber where the Queen and her alpha King are. The Trench creatures were just trying to gather enough food for their Queen's children. Aquaman rips off the roof of the cave containing the cocooned townspeople and heads to the surface. The Trench, their King and Queen follow them as Arthur triggers a volcanic reaction with his trident. The Trench begins to collapse as Arthur seals it with another large rock.

Throne of Atlantis
During the battle between Atlantis and the surface city of Gotham, The Trench were released from their undersea prison by an unknown player to be used against both sides in the war of the two worlds. Arthur had been investigating involvement regarding the Dead King's Scepter he'd attempted to intercept during an exchange between Black Manta and a mysterious Atlantean convoy who made off with it, only for The Trench to later attack both the surface world and the armies of Atlantis at Vulko's command. The latter of whom revealing himself to have started the whole conflict in the first place using the scepter he bought off of manta.

Which he was using to guide the latter invading force against both Atlantis and the world at large as vengeance, in part against Stephen Shin for outing Arthur for public notoriety and against Atlantis itself for denouncing him after Aquaman bequeathed the throne to his younger brother Orm. After having bested the former king, the Justice League presented a relenting Vulko to Arthur who willingly handed his belated king the sceptre he used to unseal said deep dwellers to aid in his gambit to put Aquaman back on the throne.

But after hearing all of this, Arthur harshly reprimanded his former adviser backhanding him into a ruined street utterly disgusted by Vulko's lack of abandon at his plans which cost hundreds of thousands their lives. With the scepter in hand using it in conjunction with his own psionic capacities, Arthur ordered to trench back into the ocean depths. Awaiting their chance to rise again.

Dead King's Trident
Aquaman uses the Dead King's Trident to command the Trench and help him fight the Xebel and the Dead King, banking on the fact that while the relic itself doesn't directly move them into action but acts as an instinctive imprint relating to subconscious subservience to the first monarch of said kingdom.

Aquaman loses control of the Trench when the Dead King's Scepter is destroyed. It is also revealed that the Trench are one of the three surviving kingdoms of Old Atlantis along with the Xebelians and Atlantians. When Atlan plunged the seven kingdoms of Atlantis into the ocean, the survivors initially believed four of the kingdoms were destroyed, and the other three survived and adapted to their new conditions with 90% of the Atlanteans dying from the event. The Trench were one of the three surviving kingdoms, a mutated form of humans who survived Atlan's destruction of his city decades ago, by mutating into monsters.

Lazarus Planet
During Batman's attempt to rescue his son Damian, who had been brainwashed by the immortal Nezha, the Helmet of Fate was shattered during the fight and its shards fell into a Lazarus Pit on the island which caused the volcano on the island to erupt and spread Lazarus Resin around the world causing global extreme weather events and Lazarus Resin rained down from the sky, mutating anyone it touched. A group of Trench were mutated, undoing their devolution into beasts to physically resemble normal humans or Atlanteans. As they also began to regain their intelligence, some of them climbed out of the ocean and onto land, which brought them into conflict with humans again, but Aquaman intervened before the violence could escalate and pledged to reintegrate the Trench back into civilisation.

Powers and abilities
The Trench have adapted to underwater life like all the Atlantean kingdoms. They can generate bio-luminescent light from their bodies and spit a chemical from their mouth that causes paralysis. The Trench have razor-sharp teeth and needle-tipped claws that can cut through anything.

Known Trench
 Trench King - The King of the Trench. Killed by Ocean Master.
 Trench Queen - The Queen of the Trench. She was killed when Aquaman threw his trident into the volcanic fissure under her.
 Trench King II - The second King of the Trench who succeeded the first after his death.
 Trench Queen II - The second Queen of the Trench.
 Shellestriah - The half-human daughter of the second Trench King.

In other media

Film
 The Trench appear in Justice League: Throne of Atlantis.
 The Trench appear in DC Super Hero Girls: Legends of Atlantis. The Siren takes command of them after finding the Book of Legends.
 An alternate universe incarnation of the Trench appear in Justice Society: World War II. This version of the species hail from Earth-2 and are controlled by Aquaman and the Advisor to help the Nazis destroy New York. The Trench engage the Justice Society of America in battle and kill Hawkman before the Flash and Black Canary destroy the monsters in turn.
 The Trench appear in Aquaman. This version of the species are one of the known tribes of Atlantis. In the past, Atlanna was sacrificed to the Trench for having a half-breed son, but she survived and escaped to the Hidden Sea. While on a quest to find the lost Trident of Atlan in the present, Aquaman and Mera are attacked by a legion of Trench, though they fend them off before reaching the Hidden Sea. After acquiring Atlan's trident, Aquaman leads the Trench into battle against Orm Marius and his followers, a feat previously believed to be impossible.
 A "horror-tinged" spin-off film called The Trench was in development, with Aquaman director James Wan set to produce while Noah Gardner and Aidan Fitzgerald were asked to pen the script. However, the project was cancelled by April 2021.

Video games
 The Trench make a cameo appearance in Black Manta's ending in Injustice 2.
 A member of the Trench appears in Lego DC Super-Villains as part of the "Aquaman" DLC.

References

External links
 Trench at DC Comics Wiki

Aquaman
DC Comics teams
DC Comics Atlanteans
DC Comics demons
Characters created by Geoff Johns